Helianthus niveus is a species of sunflower known by the common names showy sunflower and snowy sunflower. It is native to northern Mexico (Sonora, Baja California, Baja California Sur) and the Southwestern United States (Southern California, Arizona, New Mexico, and West Texas).

Helianthus niveus is a taprooted annual or perennial sunflower growing to a maximum height over 1 m (40 in). The leaves are oval or lance-shaped, often with irregular lobes or teeth, and are covered in soft, white hairs. The flower heads are fringed with 13-21 bright yellow ray florets up to 2.5 cm (1 in) long surrounding a center of yellow to purple-red disc florets.

Habitat
H. niveus grows in sandy soils, most often in sand dunes.

References

External links
USDA Plants Profile for Helianthus niveus (showy sunflower)
 Calflora: Helianthus niveus'' (Desert sunflower, Silver leaved sunflower)
UC Calphotos gallery

niveus
Flora of Northwestern Mexico
Flora of the California desert regions
Flora of the South-Central United States
Flora of Arizona
Flora of the Chihuahuan Desert
Flora of the Sonoran Deserts
Natural history of the Colorado Desert
North American desert flora
Plants described in 1895
Taxa named by George Bentham
Taxa named by Townshend Stith Brandegee